The Golden Eurydice Award is presented for an outstanding contribution, or contributions over a period, in the field of biophilosophy. It is awarded by the International Forum for Biophilosophy which was established in Belgium by royal decree in 1988. Founding members included Herman Van Den Berghe.

The award
The award consists of a sculptured golden statue of Eurydice. Awardees must make a 20-minute presentation of their work at a special Golden Keynote evening event, which usually takes place in November/December each year. Awardees are also granted Honorary membership of the forum.

Award recipients
Recipients include:
2013: Don Ihde, Albert Borgmann
2009: Emile Aarts, Kevin Warwick
2007: Craig Venter, Ananda Chakrabarty
2006: Eric Juengst 
2005: Jean-Pierre Changeux

See also

 List of biology awards
 List of philosophy awards

References 

Biology awards
Philosophy awards
Science and technology awards
Belgian awards